"Let It Rain" is a song co-written and recorded by American country music artist Mark Chesnutt. It was released in March 1997 as the second single from his Greatest Hits compilation album.  The song reached number 8 on the U.S. Billboard Hot Country Singles & Tracks chart and peaked at number 16 on the Canadian RPM Country Tracks chart.  It was written by Chesnutt, Roger Springer and Steve Leslie.

Critical reception
Deborah Evans Price, of Billboard magazine reviewed the song favorably, saying that "from the gentle opening bars of the soft and pretty melody to the final hushed notes, this is a great song - definitely one of the best in Chesnutt's already highly distinguished career." She goes on to say that his performance is "superb, sweet, and loving - but never syrupy. The well crafted song also shows off his burning talents as a songwriter."

Music video
The music video was directed by Michael McNamara and premiered in late 1996.

Chart performance
"Let It Rain" debuted at number seventy-three on the U.S. Billboard Hot Country Singles & Tracks for the week of March 15, 1997.

Year-end charts

References

1997 singles
1996 songs
Mark Chesnutt songs
Songs written by Roger Springer
Song recordings produced by Tony Brown (record producer)
Decca Records singles
Songs written by Mark Chesnutt